Pietro Veglio (Bellinzona, 1944) is a Swiss economist, from 2001 he served as Executive Director of the World Bank.
 Veglio is a visiting professor at the University of St. Gallen.

Early career 
Veglio began his career in 1969 at the Technical Cooperation Service (now the Directorate for Development and Cooperation, SDC) of the Department of Foreign Affairs.

Inter-American Development Bank 
After working at the technical cooperation service of the Swiss government, he was appointed deputy director at the Inter-American Development Bank, until 1992.

From 1992 to 1997, he worked as an advisor for the Swiss Executive Director at the World Bank in Washington, then as an expert in the institute's valuation division.

In November 1998 he became director of the evaluation division.

OECD 
After the World Bank, Veglio worked on the exam for countries of the Organization for Economic Cooperation and Development (OECD).

Executive Director at the World Bank 
In July 2001 Veglio was appointed by the Swiss Federal Council as Swiss Executive Director at the World Bank, where he replaced Matthias Meyer, who had been in office since November 1997.

Note 

1944 births
Living people
Swiss economists
World Bank people